Kajii (written: 梶井 or 梶居) is a Japanese surname. Notable people with the surname include:

, Japanese footballer
, Japanese writer

See also
Kaji (surname)

Japanese-language surnames